The Črnuče Bridge  is a bridge crossing the Sava River in Črnuče, a district of Ljubljana, the capital of Slovenia.

Bridges in Ljubljana
Bridges over the Sava in Slovenia
Road bridges in Slovenia
Črnuče District